Broughton High School is a name shared by a number of schools:
 Broughton High School, Salford, Greater Manchester, England
 Broughton High School, Lancashire, England
 Broughton High School, Edinburgh, Midlothian, Scotland
 Broughton Hall High School, Liverpool, Merseyside, England
 Needham B. Broughton High School, Raleigh, North Carolina, USA